Probizhna is a village in Chortkiv Raion near Chortkiv and Husiatyn in Ternopil Oblast (province) of western Ukraine. It belongs to Kolyndiany urban hromada, one of the hromadas of Ukraine.

References

Villages in Chortkiv Raion
Podolia Voivodeship
Kingdom of Galicia and Lodomeria
Tarnopol Voivodeship
Shtetls